Bea Malecki (born August 23, 1991) is a Swedish mixed martial artist. A professional since 2017, she currently competes in the Bantamweight division in the Ultimate Fighting Championship (UFC).

Background
Malecki's parents came to Sweden when they were about 30 years old, with Malecki speaking Polish at home. Bea Malecki was 19 years old when she tested martial arts for the first time. As a Thai boxer, she won the Swedish Championships, the European Championships and the World Cup.

Outside of MMA, Malecki is a Mechanical Engineer, getting her degree from the Royal Institute of Technology in Stockholm, Sweden.

Mixed martial arts career

Early career
Malecki made her amateur debut against Helin Paara at International Ring Fight Arena 12. She won the fight by a second-round technical knockout.

Malecki made her professional debut against Faith Davis, for the inaugural for the ExciteFight MMA Featherweight title, at ExciteFight Conquest of the Cage on November 4, 2017. Malecki won the fight by a first-round submission.

Malecki was scheduled to fight the debuting Tracy Smith at Conquest of the Cage on February 2, 2018. Malecki won the fight by a technical knockout, stopping her opponent after just 22 seconds.

On July 11, 2018, it was revealed that Malecki would be one of the fighters featured on The Ultimate Fighter: Heavy Hitters. She was the sixth pick for Team Gastelum. Malecki lost the quarterfinal bout against Leah Letson by unanimous decision.

Ultimate Fighting Championship
Malecki made her promotional debut against Duda Santana at UFC Fight Night: Gustafsson vs. Smith on June 1, 2019. She won the fight via second-round submission. Following this loss, Duda tested positive for ligandrol in an out-of-competition test.

She made her second appearance in the organization against Veronica Macedo at UFC Fight Night: Lee vs. Oliveira on March 14, 2020. She won the fight via unanimous decision.

Malecki was expected to face Tracy Cortez at UFC Fight Night 179 on October 11, 2020. However, Malecki withdrew from the bout and was replaced by Stephanie Egger.

Malecki was then scheduled to face Norma Dumont at UFC on ABC 2 on April 10, 2021. However, she withdrew from the bout due to a undisclosed reason and was replaced by Erin Blanchfield.

Malecki faced Josiane Nunes at UFC on ESPN: Cannonier vs. Gastelum on August 21, 2021. She lost the fight via knockout in round one.

Championships and accomplishments

Muay Thai 

 2016: Muay Thai Boxing World Cup - 1st place in the -67 kg category (Jönköping)

Mixed martial arts record 
 

|-
| Loss
| align=center|4–1
|  Josiane Nunes
| KO (punch)
| UFC on ESPN: Cannonier vs. Gastelum
| 
| align=center|1
| align=center|4:54
| Las Vegas, Nevada, United States
|
|-
| Win
| align=center|4–0
| Veronica Macedo
| Decision (unanimous)
| UFC Fight Night: Lee vs. Oliveira
| 
| align=center|3
| align=center|5:00
| Brasília, Brazil
|
|-
| Win
| align=center|3–0
| Duda Santana
| Submission (rear-naked choke)
| UFC Fight Night: Gustafsson vs. Smith
| 
| align=center|2
| align=center|1:59
| Stockholm, Sweden
| 
|-
| Win
| align=center|2–0
| Tracy Smith
| TKO (punches)
| Conquest of the Cage
| 
| align=center|1
| align=center|0:22
| Airway Heights, Washington, United States
|
|-
| Win
| align=center|1–0
| Faith Davis
| Technical Submission (rear-naked choke)
| ExciteFight Conquest of the Cage
| 
| align=center|1
| align=center|2:59
| Airway Heights, Washington, United States
| 
|-

Amateur mixed martial arts record

|-
| Win
| align=center|1–0
| Helin Paara
| TKO
| International Ring Fight Arena 12
| 
| align=center|2
| align=center|N/A
| Stockholm, Sweden
|
|-

See also
 List of current UFC fighters
 List of female mixed martial artists

References

External links 
 
 

1991 births
Living people
Sportspeople from Stockholm
Swedish female mixed martial artists
Bantamweight mixed martial artists
Mixed martial artists utilizing Muay Thai
Swedish Muay Thai practitioners
Female Muay Thai practitioners
Ultimate Fighting Championship female fighters
Swedish people of Polish descent